ISSM may refer to:
International Society for Sexual Medicine
International Swaminarayan Satsang Mandal
Ice Sheet System Model, an Ice-sheet model